Eyvaq (also Romanized as Īvaq; also known as Eva, Iva, and Ivāh) is a village in Sharabian Rural District, Mehraban District, Sarab County, East Azerbaijan Province, Iran. At the 2006 census, its population was 1,348, in 294 families.

Mirza Ibrahimov was born here.

References 

Populated places in Sarab County